Nodo or NODO may refer to:

 NASA Orbital Debris Observatory, New Mexico, US
 No-Do (Noticiarios y Documentales), a state-controlled series of cinema newsreels produced in Spain
 Nodo (drum), a Korean musical instrument
 NoDo (North Downtown), an area of downtown Omaha, Nebraska